Kings Point is an unincorporated community in Dade County, in the U.S. state of Missouri.

History
A post office called Kings Point was established in 1848, and remained in operation until 1909. The community was named after Samuel King, the original owner of the site.

References

Unincorporated communities in Dade County, Missouri
Unincorporated communities in Missouri